Erik Todd Dellums (born September 23, 1964) is an American actor and narrator. He played the drug kingpin Luther Mahoney for two seasons on Homicide: Life on the Street and voiced the roles as the radio DJ Three Dog in the 2008 video game Fallout 3, Prince Arcann, Thexan and Oggo in Knights of the Fallen Empire, the 2015 expansion to Star Wars: The Old Republic and Aaravos in the animated Netflix series The Dragon Prince.

Early life
Dellums was born in the San Francisco Bay Area, California and moved to Washington, D.C. in his teenage years. He earned a Bachelor of Science degree in political science from Brown University in 1986 and has since worked in Los Angeles, New York City, and Washington, D.C. He is the son of Leola Roscoe, a lawyer, and Ron Dellums, the former U.S. representative from California and mayor of Oakland. His sister Piper Dellums is an author.

Career
Dellums had minor appearances in several Spike Lee films early in his career, such as She's Gotta Have It (1986) and Do the Right Thing (1989). He was portrayed (as a child) by Travis Kyle Davis in a Disney Channel Original Movie entitled The Color of Friendship (2000), which was based on what happened when his family hosted a foreign exchange student from South Africa during the Apartheid era; Dellums had a cameo role as himself. He provided the voice of the character Koh the Face Stealer in the animated Nickelodeon series Avatar: The Last Airbender, as well as the narration for Key Constitutional Concepts, a documentary produced in 2006 by the Annenberg Foundation.

Dellums has had parts in television police dramas such as New York Undercover, Homicide: Life on the Street (in which he played drug kingpin Luther Mahoney), and The Wire (in which he played a medical examiner). He also played a doctor one episode of Homeland. Dellums provided voice acting for the 2008 video game Fallout 3 as Three Dog. He provided the voice of Nazir, a character in the video game The Elder Scrolls V: Skyrim. Dellums narrates the Travel Channel series Mysterious Journeys, as well as the documentary television series How the Universe Works and NASA's Unexplained Files on the Science Channel. Dellums narrates the Science series The Planets – hosted by former astronaut Mike Massimino – which premiered in 2017 and was retitled The Planets and Beyond for its second season in 2018.

Dellums also reprised the role of Three Dog in the YouTube lore series by ShoddyCast, and he also performs the voice for Prince/Emperor Arcann in the game Star Wars: The Old Republic expansion Knights of the Fallen Empire and its sequel expansions Knights of the Eternal Throne and Onslaught. He's also the voice provider of the character Aaravos in the Netflix series The Dragon Prince.

Dellums political and social writings on his personal blog gained notice in 2011, and his criticisms of the presidency of Barack Obama earned him guest appearances on Fox News.

Filmography

Film

Television

Video games

References

External links

Male actors from Washington, D.C.
African-American male actors
Brown University alumni
Living people
American male voice actors
20th-century American male actors
21st-century American male actors
Dellums family
20th-century African-American people
21st-century African-American people
1964 births
American people who self-identify as being of Native American descent